Afraid of Ghosts is the seventh full-length studio album from Butch Walker, and was released on Lojinx records in Europe on 2 February 2015 and  Dangerbird Records in North America on February 3, 2015. The album was announced on October 6, 2014, with the release of its first single, "Chrissie Hynde". The album's title track premiered on October 20, 2014.

Walker spent a year writing this album, and recorded it in only four days, a year after the passing of his father. According to Walker, the album is a way of "coming to terms with the past and living for the future." It's about "coming to terms with your ghosts, taking what scares you the most. And turning it into something real." The album was produced by singer/songwriter Ryan Adams at his PAX AM Studios, and features guest musicians such as Johnny Depp, Mike Viola, and Bob Mould.

Reception

Afraid of Ghosts received mostly positive reviews. Its Metacritic rating of 77 out of 100 indicates  "generally favorable reviews."

The album debuted on Billboard 200 at No. 104, selling around 6,000 copies in the first week.  It has sold 13,000 copies in the United States as of July 2016.

Track listing

Musicians
Butch Walker - vocals, acoustic guitar, electric guitar
Mike Viola - 12-string acoustic guitar, piano, electric guitar, baritone guitar, bass, vocals
Daniel Clarke - piano, pump organ, keys, vocals
Stephen Patt - accordion, acoustic guitar, pedal steel, dobro, vocals
Charlie Stavish - bass
Freddy Bakkenheuser - drums
The Section Quartet - strings
Ryan Adams - drums (track 6)
Johnny Depp - guitar solo (track 7)
Bob Mould - 12-string acoustic guitar, electric guitar, vocals (track 9)

Charts

References

External links
https://web.archive.org/web/20141112104536/https://itunes.apple.com/us/album/afraid-of-ghosts/id925820020

2015 albums
Butch Walker albums
Albums produced by Butch Walker
Dangerbird Records albums
Lojinx albums
PAX AM albums